Eritrea is a single-party state. This means that only one political party, the People's Front for Democracy and Justice, is legally allowed to exist in the country. Elections only occur to elect representatives for the country's regional assemblies and other posts within the country's districts. There are no national elections in Eritrea.

Other parties
Only the People's Front for Democracy and Justice is legally allowed to operate in Eritrea, though other parties exist outside Eritrea or illegally operate inside Eritrea.

Current parties

Former parties

See also
Politics of Eritrea
 List of political parties by country

Eritrea

Eritrea
Political parties
Parties